Costas Simitis served as a Prime Minister of Greece for three consecutive terms (1996-2004), at the head of the Panhellenic Socialist Movement (PASOK). His third cabinet was formed after the 2000 elections and was succeeded by the first cabinet of Kostas Karamanlis (New Democracy).

Third Simitis cabinet, 2000–2004

Simitis 3
Cabinets established in 2000
Cabinets disestablished in 2004
2000 in Greece
2001 in Greece
2002 in Greece
2003 in Greece
2004 in Greece
2000 establishments in Greece
2004 disestablishments in Greece
2000 in Greek politics
2002 in Greek politics
2004 in Greek politics
PASOK
2003 in Greek politics
2001 in Greek politics